Turț (pronounced ) is a commune of 6,579 inhabitants situated in Satu Mare County, Romania. It is composed of three villages: Gherța Mare (Nagygérce), Turț and Turț-Băi (Turcfürdő).

It lies 
on the banks of the Turț River and it is bordered on the north by Tarna Mare commune, on the northeast and east by Ukraine and Cămărzana commune, on the south by Gherța Mică and Turulung communes, on the southwest by Halmeu commune, and on the northwest by Bătarci commune.

References

Communes in Satu Mare County